Rocky Athas (born 15 October 1954) in Texas, is a blues songwriter and guitarist, best known for his work with Black Oak Arkansas, Glenn Hughes, Buddy Miles, Double Trouble and John Mayall.

Career

Early years 
Rocky Athas first founded blues band 'Lightning' that toured Texas and played as supporting act for numerous local bands. When he was 23, Texas music magazine Buddy ranked him in the Top 10 best guitarists. He is one of the first and youngest one to receive this recognition, also granted to Eric Johnson, Jimmie Vaughan, Stevie Ray Vaughan, Billy Gibbons or Johnny Winter.

Black Oak Arkansas 
He then joined several acts as a lead guitarist, including Black Oak Arkansas. He wrote two of the band's greatest hits, "Ready as Hell" and "Wild Bunch". While in BOA, he met Johnnie and Tommy Bolin (Deep Purple and James Gang), who became close friends. After Tommy's death, Rocky performed tribute shows to his friend with Johnnie Bolin and Glenn Hughes (Deep Purple and Trapeze) in support of the Tommy Bolin Archives foundation. In 2009, he released A Tribute to Tommy Bolin with Glenn Hughes & Friends, a live tribute album to Tommy Bolin.

2000–2010 
In 2000, Rocky recorded Blues Berries with Buddy Miles and Stevie Ray Vaughan's rhythm section, Double Trouble. Rocky also covered 'The Wind Cries Mary' for the album  Blue Haze – Songs of Jimi Hendrix.

The Rocky Athas Group 
In 2003, he founded The Rocky Athas group and released Miracle, produced by Jim Gaines, with whom he became friends while recording Blues Berries. In 2005, the band released a second album, VooDoo Moon, in collaboration with Larry Samford. In 2007, he released Lightning Strikes Twice, made up of tracks from his first band 'Lightning'.

John Mayall 
In 2009, John Mayall asked him to play lead guitar on Tough. In 2014, he recorded a second album with Mayall, A Special Life. Athas intensively toured with the legendary bluesman until 2016, when John Mayall decided to operate as a trio.

2011–present 
In 2014, Rocky released Let My Guitar Do The Talking...With My Friends on Cherryburst Records. The album is instrumental, and Athas used several vintage guitars from his personal collection. His old friend Smokin' Joe Kubek and John Mayall both appeared on the album.

In 2015, Rocky released two compilations, entitled The Essential Rocky Athas (Volume I and Volume II), featuring several bonus tracks, including a cover of "'White Room" by Cream.

In 2017, Athas released Shakin' The Dust, produced by Jim Gaines (Stevie Ray Vaughan, Santana's Supernatural).

Influences 
Rocky Athas has been heavily influenced by Jimi Hendrix and Eric Clapton. Other influences are Freddie King, The Beatles, Cream, Mountain and Leslie West.

Discography

With Black Oak Arkansas 

 1984: Ready as Hell
 1999: The Wild Bunch

With Glenn Hughes & Friends 

 1997: A Tribute to Tommy Bolin

With Buddy Miles 

 2002: Blues Berries

With The Rocky Athas Group 

 2003: Miracle
 2005: VooDoo Moon
 2007: Lightning Strikes Twice
 2017: Shakin' the Dust

With John Mayall 

 2009: Tough
 2011: Live in London
 2014: A Special Life

Solo 

 1999: That's What I Know
 2007: Rocky Athas' Lightning - Lightning Strikes Twice
 2014: Let My Guitar Do The Talking... with My Friends
 2017: Shakin' The Dust

References 

1954 births
Living people
Guitarists from Texas
20th-century American guitarists
Electric blues musicians